was a museum in Sendai, Miyagi Prefecture, Japan.

History
Ten years later, the  opened in the Foundation's new headquarters building in Sendai, with  the first director. In 1945, the Museum was badly damaged during the bombing of Sendai, losing its entire botanical collection as well as many documents. The repaired building was finally demolished in 1973 to make way for redevelopment. Due to worsening finances, in 2005 the Museum decided to donate its entire collection to the National Museum of Nature and Science, the transfer of objects taking place the following year. It finally closed in 2015 and the Foundation was dissolved later the same year.

Publications
 Saito Ho-on Kai Museum of Natural History research bulletin (1977–2015; vols. 45–79)
 Saito Ho-on Kai Museum research bulletin  (1934–1976; vols. 1–44)

See also

 Sendai City Museum

References

Museums in Miyagi Prefecture
Defunct museums in Japan
Natural history museums in Japan
Sendai
Museums established in 1933
Museums disestablished in 2015
1933 establishments in Japan
2015 disestablishments in Japan

斎藤報恩会自然史博物館